Shah Azizur Rahman (died 17 September 2018) was a Bangladesh Awami League politician and a Jatiya Sangsad member from the Sylhet-2 constituency.

Early life and education
Rahman was born into a Bengali Muslim family, in his ancestral home in Umarpur Union of present-day Osmani Nagar Upazila, Sylhet District, Bangladesh.

Career 
Rahman was elected to the parliament in July 1996 from Sylhet-2 as a Bangladesh Awami League candidate. Earlier, he was chairman of Balaganj Upazila Parishad.

References 

1930s births
2018 deaths
People from Osmani Nagar Upazila
Awami League politicians
7th Jatiya Sangsad members